Dee Leon Mewbourne  (born December 9, 1961) is a retired United States Navy vice admiral who served as 16th deputy commander of United States Transportation Command between July 2, 2019 and June 29, 2022.

Naval career
Mewbourne graduated from the United States Naval Academy in 1982 and was designated a naval flight officer in December 1983. He later earned a master's degree in business administration from Colorado State University. He is an honor graduate of the United States Naval Test Pilot School and completed the navy's Nuclear Power Program, Air Command and Staff College (ACSC), Joint Forces Staff College, and numerous executive education courses.

Mewbourne holds the rare distinction of serving as commanding officer of three nuclear aircraft carriers. After serving a standard tour in command of the USS Dwight D. Eisenhower, he took command of the USS Enterprise in early 2011 after the previous CO of Enterprise was relieved for poor performance. In late 2011, Captain Mewbourne was called in to take command of the USS Harry S. Truman after the previous CO, Captain Tushar Tembe, died suddenly.

At sea, Mewbourne completed sea assignments flying the A-6E Intruder aircraft in Attack Squadron (VA) 34 embarked aboard ; VA-75 aboard ; Carrier Air Wing (CVW) 3 aboard Eisenhower; and as the executive officer of VA-196 aboard . After transitioning to the EA-6B Prowler aircraft, he served as the executive officer of VAQ-139 aboard Abraham Lincoln.

Ashore, Mewbourne served as a flight instructor with VA-42, the East Coast A-6E Fleet Replacement Squadron (FRS), and project officer at the Strike Aircraft Test Directorate. Later, he served as military assistant and trip coordinator for the secretary and deputy secretary of defense; chief of staff for Navy Cyber Forces; on the staff of Commander, Naval Air Force Atlantic; and director, Maritime Operations for United States Fleet Forces Command.

Mewbourne retired from the U.S. Navy on June 30, 2022 at Scott Air Force Base. His comments about his time in the Navy and as deputy commander of USTRANSCOM are posted here: https://www.youtube.com/watch?v=W4Xk04UpNAs. The live broadcast of his retirement ceremony is here at USTRANSCOM (YouTube): https://www.youtube.com/watch?v=6XxPLk0iX1c.

Awards and decorations

 He received the Carl Vinson Leadership Award at the Naval Academy.
 Upon completing initial flight training in the A-6E Intruder at VA-42 in 1985, he was selected as the Replacement Bombardier/Navigator of the Year.
 In 1987, he was selected as the East Coast A-6 community’s Junior Intruder of the Year.
 In August 2012, he was awarded the Truman Foundation Leadership Award for inspirational leadership.

References

1961 births
Living people
United States Naval Academy alumni
United States Naval Flight Officers
United States Naval Test Pilot School alumni
Colorado State University alumni
United States Navy personnel of the Gulf War
Air Command and Staff College alumni
Joint Forces Staff College alumni
Recipients of the Legion of Merit
United States Navy admirals
Recipients of the Defense Superior Service Medal
Recipients of the Navy Distinguished Service Medal